Mount Cotton Hillclimb is a permanent tarmac hillclimbing circuit at Mount Cotton, Queensland, Australia.
It is owned and run by the MG Car Club of Queensland.
Club events are run at intervals of around 4–6 weeks.
The Queensland Hillclimb Championship is run there every year, and the Australian Hillclimb Championship is run there every 7 years.

References

http://www.trackattack.com.au/hillclimb

Hillclimbing
Motorsport venues in Queensland
Sports venues in Queensland
Redland City